Karen Zambos is an American fashion designer based in Los Angeles, California. She designs her own clothing line called Karen Zambos Vintage Couture, as well as a belt collection called Elegantly Waisted. She also co-designs a handbag collection called Zambos & Siega.

Karen Zambos designs are very popular among celebrities such as Nicole Richie, Jessica Alba, Fergie, Kourtney Kardashian, Paris Hilton, Selma Blair and many others.

References

American fashion designers
American women fashion designers
Living people
Year of birth missing (living people)
21st-century American women